Kim Han-gil (born 17 September 1953) is a South Korean politician, journalist and writer. He served as the 15th, 17th and 19th National Assembly member of the Republic of Korea and the Minister of Culture and Tourism.

Career 
Having studied political science and journalism at Konkuk University, Kim worked as a journalist in the United States, writing for the Hankook Ilbo and the JoongAng Ilbo. He became active in the National Congress for New Politics in 1996, and remained a member of the main liberal party under its various names until 2016. He served as Minister of Culture and Tourism from 2000 to 2001, undertaking a highly publicized trip to North Korea on 10 March 2001, ostensibly to discuss tourism and culture arrangements. Subsequent to his trip, Kim announced an agreement to form a joint North–South team to compete in the 2001 World Table Tennis Championships, but North Korea rejected the arrangement later in March, citing "incomplete agreement and preparation problems".

Kim became a member of the National Assembly in 1996, but lost his seat in 2008. He returned to the Assembly in the 2012 elections, and became chairman of the Democratic Party in 2013. When the Democratic Party merged with Ahn Cheol-soo's New Political Vision Party to form the New Politics Alliance for Democracy in March 2014, Kim became co-chairman of the new party alongside Ahn. Kim and Ahn both resigned as co-chairmen three months later, however, following the party's disappointing performance in the 2014 by-elections, which had seen a conservative candidate win a constituency in South Jeolla Province for the first time in 26 years.

On 3 January 2016, after Ahn had left the NPAD's successor, the Minjoo Party of Korea, Kim announced that he was leaving the Minjoo Party to join Ahn as a founding member of the new People's Party. In March, in the lead-up to the 2016 legislative elections, Kim fell into dispute with Ahn over the need for an electoral alliance with the Minjoo Party. Kim resigned his position as co-chairman of the party's election campaign committee on March 11 over the dispute, and with Ahn refusing to pursue such a pact and co-chairman Chun Jung-bae backing down from the prospect, on March 17 he withdrew his candidacy for the upcoming elections. Kim nonetheless welcomed the results of the election, which were positive for the People's Party, stating that the day for a regime change was not far away.

He did not take active part when the People's Party joined the Bareun Mirae Party as it merged with the Bareun Party.

Disease 
In October 2017, Kim was diagnosed with stage 4 lung cancer with a survival rate of 10% and he disappeared from the public scene. He got one lunge removed and was unconscious for two weeks after the operation.

Controversy 
Kim is known for his "acerbic" remarks: in 2007 he labelled English teachers in Korea "white trash", and he criticized President Park Geun-hye for giving speeches in foreign languages overseas.

Bibliography

Essays 

 (1984) American Day. Original: (미국일기)
 (2000) Hangil Kim’s Hope Diary. Original: (김한길의 희망일기)
 2006) Don’t Be Away When I Open My Eyes. Original: (눈뜨면 없어라)

Novels 

 (1981) Wind and Stuffed. Original: (바람과 박제)
 (1981) The Death of Seneca. Original: (세네카의 죽음)
 (1989) Camel's Don't Cry Alone. Original (낙타는 따로 울지 않는다)
 (1991) A Woman's Man. Original: (여자의 남자)
 (1995) I Saw Her Standing. Original: (거기 그녀가 서 있는 걸 보았네)

References

External links
Kim Han-gil on Naver Blog

1952 births
Democratic Party (South Korea, 2000) politicians
Government ministers of South Korea
Living people
Minjoo Party of Korea politicians
People's Party (South Korea, 2016) politicians
Politicians from Tokyo
Uri Party politicians
Konkuk University alumni